The Panasonic Leica DG Summilux 25mm 1.4 lens is a normal lens for Micro Four Thirds system cameras.  It is co-branded between Leica and Panasonic, built in Japan under Leica management.

Focusing is internal, so polarizing filters can be used consistently.  The 46mm thread lets a Micro Four Thirds user share filters between it, the Panasonic 14mm, Panasonic Lumix 20mm, Panasonic Leica 45mm, Panasonic 45-175mm, Olympus M.Zuiko Digital ED 12mm f/2 and Olympus M.Zuiko Digital ED 60mm f/2.8 Macro lenses.

Reviews are positive, ranging from "very sharp" to "sensational".

References

External links 
 http://panasonic.net/avc/lumix/systemcamera/gms/lens/dg_summilux_25.html

025mm f/1.4
Leica lenses